2007 S.League was the twelfth season of Singapore's professional football league. It was won by Singapore Armed Forces, which was their sixth league title.

Changes from 2006
 Korean Super Reds represented the Korean community in Singapore. They were renamed Super Reds on 14 August 2007.
 Liaoning Guangyuan were a farm team of Chinese Super League club Liaoning.
 Sporting Afrique went out of operations at the end of the 2006 season after the Football Association of Singapore rejected their application to participate in the 2007 season.

Foreign players
Each club is allowed to have up to a maximum of 4 foreign players.

 Albirex Niigata (S), Liaoning Guangyuan and Super Reds are not allowed to hire any foreigners.

League table

External links
 S.League 2007

Singapore Premier League seasons
1
Sing
Sing